(The Lord is my faithful Shepherd), 112, is a cantata by Johann Sebastian Bach, a church cantata for the second Sunday after Easter. Bach composed the chorale cantata in Leipzig and first performed it on 8 April 1731. It is based on the hymn by Wolfgang Meuslin, a paraphrase of Psalm 23 written in 1530, sung to a melody by Nikolaus Decius.

Bach, the Thomaskantor in Leipzig from May 1723, composed this cantata to complete his second cantata cycle of chorale cantatas, begun in 1724. He used the lyrics of the hymn unchanged, which reflect the psalm and Jesus as the Good Shepherd. Bach structured the work in five movements. The outer choral movements are a chorale fantasia and a four-part closing chorale, both on the hymn tune. Bach set the inner stanzas as aria – recitative – aria, with music unrelated to the hymn tune. He scored the cantata for four vocal soloists, a four-part choir and a Baroque instrumental ensemble of two horns, two oboes d'amore, strings and continuo. Bach scholars agree that the brass instruments, normally reserved for Feast days, could come from an earlier chorale fantasia of the same melody with the text of the German Gloria.

History and words 

In his second year as Thomaskantor in Leipzig, Bach composed chorale cantatas between the first Sunday after Trinity of 1724 and Palm Sunday of 1725, but for Easter he returned to cantatas on more varied texts. He had not composed a chorale cantata yet for the occasion , the second Sunday after Easter. The prescribed readings for that Sunday were from the First Epistle of Peter (Christ as a model – ), and from the Gospel of John, (the Good Shepherd – ).

During the cycle of 1724/25, the text of the inner stanzas of a hymn was paraphrased by a contemporary poet with whom Bach collaborated. In this cantata however, Bach used the hymn text unchanged, a 1530 hymn in five stanzas written by Wolfgang Meuslin as a paraphrase of Psalm 23. The hymn is sung to the melody of "", the German Gloria, by Nikolaus Decius (1522). The hymn's topic, the Lord as the Good Shepherd, has traditionally been used for Jesus and is thus related to the gospel.

Music

Structure and scoring 
Bach structured the cantata in five movements. The text and tune of the hymn are kept in the outer choral movements, a chorale fantasia and a four-part closing chorale, which frame an alternating arias and a  recitative. Bach scored the work for four vocal soloists (soprano, alto, tenor, bass), a four-part choir and a Baroque instrumental ensemble of two horns (Co), two oboes d'amore (Oa), two violins (Vl), viola (Va) and basso continuo.

In the following table of the movements, the scoring follows the Neue Bach-Ausgabe. The keys and time signatures are taken from Alfred Dürr, using the symbol for common time. The continuo, playing throughout, is not shown.

Movements 

In the opening chorus, a chorale fantasia, the melody of the German  "" is embedded in an orchestral concerto. The movement opens with calls derived from the chorale tune played on the two horns, leading to a free concerto with the strings and oboes. The cantus firmus is sung by the soprano in long notes, while the lower voices engage in imitation. John Eliot Gardiner compares the movement to the openings of the two former cantatas for the same occasion: "The presence of two horns ... reveals a much more regal portrait of the Good Shepherd than we have previously met." Bach had composed a different chorale fantasia on the same melody in Auf Christi Himmelfahrt allein, BWV 128, with similar instrumentation.

The inner three movements quote the text of the hymn without change, but their music is not related to the hymn tune. The alto aria is accompanied by an obbligato oboe. It is structured in two similar parts, and is in pastoral . The steady flow of the oboe can be seen as depicting the "pure water" mentioned in the text, the steps in the continuo as "the steps made on this significant journey" "on the pathway of the righteousness of His commandments".

The central movement begins as an arioso, accompanied by the continuo, illustrating the walk through the "valley of darkness". The second part is a dramatic recitative with strings, first expressing "" (persecution, sorrow, trouble) in a broken melodic line against sustained string chords, then "Thy rod and Thy staff comfort me", where the "first violins weave a comforting little melody".

The following duet expresses enjoyment at God's table in a dance, a bourrée.

The cantata closes with a four-part chorale, most instruments playing colla parte, while the horns play different parts because of their limited range.

Recordings 

The selection is taken from the listing on the Bach Cantatas Website. Ensembles playing period instruments in historically informed performances are marked green.

References

Sources 
 
 Der Herr ist mein getreuer Hirt BWV 112; BC A 67 / Chorale cantata (3rd Sunday of Easter) Bach Digital
 BWV 112 Der Herr ist mein getreuer Hirt: English translation, University of Vermont
 Luke Dahn: BWV 112.5 bach-chorales.com

Church cantatas by Johann Sebastian Bach
1731 compositions
Psalm-related compositions by Johann Sebastian Bach
Chorale cantatas